Seven: A Suite for Orchestra is the fourth studio album, and the first classical solo album by Genesis keyboardist Tony Banks. It was released by Naxos Records in 2004. The suite is performed by the London Philharmonic Orchestra and conducted by Mike Dixon. Banks plays piano on "Spring Tide", "The Ram" and "The Spirit of Gravity".

Track listing
 "Spring Tide"
 "Black Down"
 "The Gateway"
 "The Ram"
 "Earthlight"
 "Neap Tide"
 "The Spirit of Gravity"

2004 classical albums
Tony Banks (musician) albums
Albums produced by Nick Davis (record producer)
Naxos Records albums